Isoguvacine is a GABAA receptor agonist used in scientific research.

See also
 Gaboxadol
 Muscimol

References

Carboxylic acids
Tetrahydropyridines
GABAA receptor agonists
GABAA-rho receptor agonists